Frederick Otis Barton Jr. (June 5, 1899 – April 15, 1992) was an American deep-sea diver, inventor and actor.

Early life and career
Born in New York, the independently wealthy Barton designed the first bathysphere and made a dive with William Beebe off Bermuda in June 1930. They set the first record for deep-sea diving by descending . Barton acted in the 1938 Hollywood movie, Titans of the Deep.

Later career
In 1949, Barton set a new world record with a 4,500 foot (1,372 m) dive in the Pacific Ocean, using his benthoscope (from the Greek benthos, meaning 'sea bottom', and scopein, 'to view'), which was designed by Barton and Maurice Nelles.

Barton wrote the book The World Beneath the Sea, published in 1953. Like Beebe, Barton was also interested in exploring tropical rain forests, and spent considerable time in places like Gabon. In 1978, Barton successfully tested a "jungle spaceship" (actually an airship) that was intended to film wildlife.

References

Further reading
 Matsen, Bradford. Descent - The Heroic Discovery of the Abyss, Pantheon Books, 2005. 
 Matsen, Bradford. The Incredible Record-Setting Deep-Sea Dive of the Bathysphere. Berkeley Heights, NJ: Enslow Publishers, 2003. 
 Otis Barton, "Adventure on land and under the sea", Longmans, London, 1954.
 Biography of Otis Barton on the website of the MIT School of Engineering

External links
 "Three Hundred Fathoms Beneath The Sea", October 1930, Popular Mechanics
 

1899 births
1992 deaths
American male film actors
American underwater divers
20th-century American male actors
Harvard College alumni
20th-century American inventors